Quezon Bridge is a combined arch and prestressed concrete girder bridge crossing the Pasig River between Quezon Boulevard in Quiapo and Padre Burgos Avenue in Ermita in Manila, Philippines.

Quezon Bridge was built to take the much greater and heavier 20th century vehicular traffic than the nineteenth century Puente Colgante, which it replaced, was designed to carry. Quezon Bridge was constructed in 1939 under the supervision of the engineering firm Pedro Siochi and Company. The bridge was designed as an Art Deco style arch bridge and was inspired by the design of the Sydney Harbour Bridge. It was named in honor of Manuel Luis Quezon, the President of the Philippines at the time of its construction.

It was wrecked during World War II and subsequently rebuilt in 1946. It is a subject of frequent repairs, reinforcement and retrofits through the years due to increasing utilization, age and at one point, damage by fire in 2014. As a result, the bridge became restricted only to light vehicles. Its last major reconstruction was done in 1996. The bridge was lighted up with new LED lights in February 2022.

Gallery

References

Bridges in Manila
Arch bridges
Art Deco architecture in the Philippines
Buildings and structures in Ermita
Buildings and structures in Quiapo, Manila
Bridges completed in 1939